Yao Dieudonne (born 14 May 1997) is an Ivorian footballer who plays for Kolding IF in the Danish third tier.

Club career

OB
Yao went on a trial at OB in the autumn 2015. That went successfully, and he was offered a contract.

Yao got his debut on 15 May 2016 against Hobro IK in the Danish Superliga, that OB lost 0-1. He came on the pitch in the 82nd minute, where he replaced Mikkel Desler. He was moved up to the first team squad in the summer 2016, after playing a half year at the U19 squad. In November 2016, his contract got extended until 2020.

Thisted FC
In September 2019, Yao joined Danish third tier club Thisted FC and a few days later, scored two goals in his debut in a 4-0 win.

Kolding
In July 2022, Yao moved to Kolding IF.

References

External links

1997 births
Living people
Ivorian footballers
Ivorian expatriate footballers
Association football midfielders
Danish Superliga players
Danish 1st Division players
Danish 2nd Division players
Odense Boldklub players
Thisted FC players
Kolding IF players
Ivorian expatriate sportspeople in Denmark
Expatriate men's footballers in Denmark
Vendsyssel FF players